John Myers may refer to:

John Myers (medium) (died 1972) British dentist and spiritualist medium
John Myers (photographer) (born 1944), British landscape and portrait photographer
John Myers (radio executive) (1959–2019), British radio executive and presenter
John Gillespy Myers (1831–1901), owner of John G. Myers Company, a department store in Albany, New York
J. G. Myers (John Golding Myers, 1897–1942), British entomologist
John H. Myers (born 1945), American businessman
John Howard Myers (1880–1956), farmer and political figure on Prince Edward Island
John J. Myers (1941–2020), American Archbishop of Newark
John L. Myers (born 1947), American politician, member, Pennsylvania House of Representatives
John Myers Myers (1906–1988), American author
John Ripley Myers (1864–1899), co-founder of Bristol-Myers Squibb
John S. Myers, Los Angeles politician
John T. Myers (congressman) (1927–2015), United States Representative from Indiana
John Twiggs Myers (1871–1952), United States Marine Corps general
John Wescott Myers (1911–2008), World War II test pilot
John W. Myers (c.1864–c.1919), Welsh-born baritone singer
Buddy Myers (1906–1967), American sound engineer, sometimes credited as John Myers

See also
Jack Myers (disambiguation)
John Meyers (disambiguation)
John Miers (disambiguation)